The 2004 Swedish Open was a men's tennis tournament played on outdoor clay courts. It was the 57th edition of the Swedish Open, and was part of the International Series of the 2004 ATP Tour. It took place at the Båstad tennisstadion in Båstad, Sweden, from 5 July through 11 July 2004. Eighth-seeded Mariano Zabaleta won the singles title.

Finals

Singles

 Mariano Zabaleta defeated  Gastón Gaudio, 6–1, 4–6, 7–6(7–4)
It was Zabaleta's 1st title of the year, and his 3rd overall. It was his 2nd win at the event.

Doubles

 Mahesh Bhupathi /  Jonas Björkman defeated  Simon Aspelin /  Todd Perry, 4–6, 7–6(7–2), 7–6(8–6)
It was Bhupathi's 4th title of the year, and his 35th overall. It was Björkman's 3rd title of the year, and his 36th overall.

References

External links
 ITF tournament edition details
 ATP tournament profile
 Singles draw
 Doubles draw

Swedish Open
2004
2004 in Swedish tennis
July 2004 sports events in Europe
Swed